Opposite Day is a make believe game usually played by children. Conceptually, Opposite Day is a holiday where things are said and done in an opposite manner. It is not a holiday on any calendar and therefore one can declare that any day of the year is Opposite Day (sometimes retroactively) to indicate something which will be said, or has just been said should be understood opposite to its original meaning (similar to the practice of crossed fingers to automatically nullify promises).

Game mechanics 

Despite the name, Opposite Day does not necessarily last for one 24-hour calendar day. Opposite Day begins when someone declares it to be Opposite Day, and ends whenever they stop. Participants often need to use reverse psychology and antonyms in order to effectively communicate. People will say one thing when it means another.

In childhood development 
The game has also been compared to a children's "philosophy course" in the way that it encourages children to think. While certain things have clear and obvious opposites, such as "yes" and "no" or "black" and "white," anything outside a clear binary can be hard to find clear opposites for. For instance, what is the opposite of ice cream? What is the opposite of taking a bath?

When a child is learning about opposites, they are learning skills they will use in math, science, and reading. In language therapy, opposites or antonyms might be addressed because they help grow vocabulary, help children understand basic concepts, and enhance overall understanding of language. It is encouraged for parents to help children try to find opposites.

In popular culture 
Opposite Day features occasionally in children's media.

In a Calvin and Hobbes strip, Calvin asks Hobbes if a bee has landed on him. Hobbes says no, and Calvin is then stung by the bee. Hobbes justifies himself by saying "I meant "no, there is a bee". Today is Opposite Day!"

In a Pearls Before Swine comic strip, Pig declares it to be Opposite Day. The (normally good-natured) character Pig then violently punches Rat out of the strip and says "things are different on 'Opposite Day.'"

A season 1 episode of SpongeBob SquarePants centers around the  titular character's celebration of the holiday by dressing as and acting like his neighbor Squidward Tentacles.

It inspired the 2009 film of the same name, imagining a world where children are in charge of adults.

In The Whitest Kids U' Know sketch Opposite Day Lawyer, a defense lawyer with a guilty client tells the jury “in five seconds, it will officially be Opposite Day” so they will vote “not guilty.” The judge and prosecution both protest that “it’s not Opposite Day,” but their statements are taken in the opposite meaning, accidentally affirming that it is in fact Opposite Day

See also 
Bizarro World
Freaky Friday
Childlore

References 

Unofficial observances
Play (activity)